Human trypanosomiasis is a cutaneous condition caused by several species of trypanosomes, with skin manifestations usually being observed in the earlier stages of the disease as evanescent erythema, erythema multiforme, and edema, especially angioedema.

See also 
 Trypanosomiasis
 Skin lesion

References 

Parasitic infestations, stings, and bites of the skin